Fisher's Grant 24   is a Mi'kmaq reserve located in Pictou County, Nova Scotia.

It is solely used by the Pictou Landing First Nation.

References

Indian reserves in Nova Scotia
Communities in Pictou County
Mi'kmaq in Canada